Karan (born 19 August 1969) is an Indian actor who has appeared predominantly in Tamil and Malayalam films. He started his career as a child actor (under the stage name Master Raghu). In the 1990s he started to act in leading and villain roles. In the mid-2000s, after a sabbatical, Karan chose to prioritise appearing in films where he would portray the lead role following the relative success of Kokki (2006).

Career 
Karan started his career as child artist under the name Master Raghu for more than 70 films in Malayalam and Tamil. In 1992, he made his Tamil debut as an adult in Annamalai starring alongside Rajinikanth in an uncredited role, before making a breakthrough with his performance as a rogue college student in Nammavar alongside Kamal Haasan.

In 2006, Karan became a solo hero with Kokki and continued with films like Karuppusamy Kuththagaithaarar and Kathavarayan. His recent films are Sooran (2014) and Uchathula Shiva (2016).

In 2018, a clip from his film Coimbatore Mappillai went viral online, prompting internet users to associate the word "Shroov" with the actor.

Other work 
Karan made his advertisement debut in a 45-second Mahindra Duro advertisement with Bollywood actress Kareena Kapoor.

Awards 
Kerala State Film Awards
 1974 – Best Child Artist – Rajahamsam
 1975 – Best Child Artist – Prayanam, Swami Ayyappan

Tamil Nadu State Film Awards
2009 -Tamil Nadu State Film Award for Best Actor – Malayann

Filmography

As child artist: Credited as Master Raghu

As actor

Films

Television

References

External links 
 

1967 births
Tamil male actors
20th-century Indian male actors
Male actors in Kannada cinema
Male actors in Malayalam cinema
Indian male film actors
Kerala State Film Award winners
Living people
Male actors from Tamil Nadu
21st-century Indian male actors
Tamil Nadu State Film Awards winners
Male actors in Tamil cinema
Indian male child actors